The Archdeacon of St Davids is a senior cleric in the Church in Wales' Diocese of St Davids. The archdeacon is the senior priest with responsibility over the area of the archdeaconry of St Davids, one of three archdeaconries in the diocese (the others are Cardigan and Carmarthen). The Archdeaconry of St Davids comprises the four rural deaneries of Daugleddau, Dewisland/Fishguard, Pembroke and Roose.

The first recorded archdeacons of St Davids occur soon after the Norman Conquest. However, no territorial titles are recorded until after .

List of archdeacons of St Davids

 1175–1214 Pontius
 1215–1222 Martin
 1219–1229 Hugh of Clun
 1231–? Jordan of the Three Mountains
 1248–1259 Richard de Knovill
 1276–1280 Peter de Quevel (afterwards Bishop of Exeter, 1280)
 1280–1287 Robert de Haverford
 1293–1307 John Foke
 1319 Philip
 1328 Henry de Gower (afterwards Bishop of St Davids, 1328)
 1328–1334 David Franceys
 ?–1349 John Faulkes
 1349–? Richard Cleangre
 1363,1383 John Goch or Gough
 1361–1368 Adam de Bokelyn or Rokelyn
 1388–1400 John de Bowland
 1400–1419 John Hiot
 1420 John Thomas
 1420–1422 Edmund Nicholls
 1422–1424 William Ryley
 ?–1434 William Pencrych
 1434–? William Thame
 1458 John Smith 
 1459 Richard Caunton
 1473-?1476 John Smith (2nd term; afterwards Bishop of Llandaff, 1476)
 1500–1514 Thomas Saynte
 ?–1527 John Fychan
 ?–1547 Andrew Whitmay (Bishop of Chrysopolis)
 1557–1581 Richard Harford
 ?–1581 John Pratt
 1607–1644 Robert Rudd (ejected and imprisoned, 1644)
 1644–1667 Hugh Lloyd (also Bishop of Llandaff, 1660)
 1667–? Anthony Jones
 1678–? George Owen
 1691–1732 John Medley
 1732–1732 Walter Morgan
 1732–?1737 Arthur Williams
 1737–1749 Richard Davies
 1749–1767 Thomas Burton
 1767–1805 Charles Moss
 1805–1831 Ralph Churton
 1831–1833 Edward Owen
 1833–1863 Thomas Bevan
 1864–1874 George Clark
 1874–1883 Richard Lewis (afterwards Bishop of Llandaff, 1883)
 1883–1888 Charles Edmondes
 1888–1900 George Christopher Hilbers (resigned)
 1900–1920 David Williams
 1920–1927 David Prosser (afterwards Bishop of St Davids, 1927)
 1927–1928 Gilbert Joyce (afterwards Bishop of Monmouth, 1928)
 1929–1936 Edward Lincoln Lewis
 1937–1942 Richard Rice Thomas (died 1942)
 1942–1949 Bickerton Edwards
 1949–1962 Christopher Gwynne Lewis
 1963–1967 David Herbert Lloyd (died 1967)
 1968–1969 Ronald James Tree
 1970–1982 Benjamin Alec Lewis
 1982–1988 Dewi Bridges (afterwards Bishop of Swansea and Brecon, 1988)
 1988–1991 Ivor Rees, Assistant Bishop of St Davids (afterwards Bishop of St Davids, 1991)
 1991–1996 Cyril John Harvey
 1997–2002 Graham Davies
 2003–2010 John Holdsworth (afterwards Archdeacon in Cyprus, 2010)
 2010–2013 Keith Smalldon
 2013–2018 Dennis Wight
22 March 2018present Paul Mackness

References

Saint David